Hyde Park–Kenwood Historic District is the name of the National Register of Historic Places (NRHP) district on the South Side of Chicago that includes parts of the Hyde Park and Kenwood community areas of Chicago, Illinois.  The northern part of this district overlaps with the officially designated Chicago Landmark Kenwood District. This northern part of the Hyde Park–Kenwood Historic District contains the Chicago home of Barack Obama. The entire district was added to the NRHP on February 14, 1979, and expanded on August 16, 1984, and May 16, 1986. The district is bounded to the north, south, east and west, respectively by 47th Street, 59th Street, Lake Park Avenue and Cottage Groves Avenue. Despite the large amount of property associated with the University of Chicago, the Hyde Park–Kenwood Historic District is mostly residential. The district is considered to be significant for its architecture and education.

Among the Hyde Park–Kenwood Historic District's contributing properties are numerous NRHP listings in Hyde Park: Frank R. Lillie House, Isidore H. Heller House, Amos Jerome Snell Hall and Charles Hitchcock Hall, Arthur H. Compton House, Chicago Pile-1, St. Thomas Church and Convent, Frederick C. Robie House, George Herbert Jones Laboratory and Robert A. Millikan House. No NRHP listings from Kenwood are within the historic districts boundaries.  The NRHP-listed University Apartments are also within the district. Additionally, Chicago Pile-1 and Robie House, which are in the district, are two of the four Chicago Registered Historic Places from the original October 15, 1966 NRHP list.

See also
National Register of Historic Places listings in South Side Chicago

References

External links
nomination form

Historic districts in Chicago
South Side, Chicago
Buildings and structures on the National Register of Historic Places in Chicago
Mission Revival architecture in Illinois
Prairie School architecture in Illinois
Victorian architecture in Illinois
Historic districts on the National Register of Historic Places in Illinois